Ronald "Jaron" Crane is an American politician serving as a member of the Idaho House of Representatives for the 12B district. He assumed office on December 1, 2022.

Early life and education 
Crane was born and raised in Nampa, Idaho, the youngest of six children born to Ron Crane. His older brother, Brent Crane, is also a member of the Idaho House of Representatives. Jaron attended Hobe Sound Bible College before earning an associate's degree in business management from Ohio Christian University. He later earned a Bachelor of Arts degree in political science from Boise State University.

Career 
While attending Boise State University, Crane joined the Idaho Army National Guard. He is the vice president of Crane Alarm Service and co-founder of American Fire Protection. Crane was elected to the Idaho House of Representatives in November 2022. He is a member of the House Business Committee.

References 

Living people
Idaho Republicans
Members of the Idaho House of Representatives
People from Nampa, Idaho
People from Canyon County, Idaho
Boise State University alumni
Year of birth missing (living people)